Colonel Gaétan Bédard,  is a Canadian Army officer who is currently serving as the Commandant of RMC Saint-Jean since July 23, 2021. Previously, Bédard served as commandant of the Canadian Forces Leadership and Recruit School and was a Executive Assistant to the Vice Chief of the Defense Staff at National Defense Headquarters.

Education 
Gaétan Bédard enrolled into the Canadian Armed Forces in 1994 and attended the Royal Military College Saint-Jean and the Royal Military College of Canada where he would graduate with a bachelor's degree in Military Studies. In addition he holds a Masters of Defence Studies from the Canadian Forces College, and a Master of Arts in Strategic Studies from the US Army Command and General Staff College.

Military career 
After Graduating from the Royal Military College Bédard commissioned into the 2nd Battalion, Royal 22e Régiment as a Infantry Platoon commander. In 2002 he would deploy to Bosnia and Herzegovina for Operation Palladium part of the NATO intervention in Bosnia and Herzegovina. He would later be a Company commander in Operation Hestia in Haiti with the 3rd Battalion. He would later deploy to Afghanistan as a mentor to Afghan army and police elements, for which he would be awarded with the Chief of the Defence Staff Commendation.

In 2016, Bédard took command of the Canadian Forces Leadership and Recruit School a position he held until 2018. In July 2021, Bédard took over command of the Royal Military College Saint-Jean and is currently the CO.

References 

Royal 22nd Regiment officers
Living people
Year of birth missing (living people)